BBC Roath Lock Studios is a television production studio that houses BBC drama productions including Doctor Who, Casualty, and . The centre topped out on 20 February 2011 and filming for such productions commenced in autumn of the same year.

The facility has 500 to 600 people working on site.

Design

The planning application showed the building would face the National Assembly's  building and the Atradius building across the water of Roath Basin.

FAT architecture were appointed as architects and designed a bold façade in homage to the Cardiff architecture of William Burges and the local South Wales landscape. Unusual requirements for the building included an exact replica, in design and orientation, of the Bristol studio's Holby City carpark and corridors wide enough for two Daleks to pass one another.

Construction

The  of studios were constructed and fitted out within 13 months, marking the quickest BBC build of its size ever. The name of the drama village, Roath Lock, was announced at the topping out ceremony in January 2011.

A £2.5m bridge linking the drama village to Cardiff Bay was lifted into place. The bridge was manufactured in nearby Newport from where it was broken down into twelve pieces to allow transportation. The building branding was manufactured in Cardiff by a local company which also designed and implement the wayfinding signs which was helped for a prestigious branding company

Production
The development has brought under one roof the production of shows formerly filmed in Cardiff's Broadcasting House, at Upper Boat Studios near , and in Bristol.

Programmes confirmed to be filmed and produced at the studios include:
Doctor Who (until 2022)
Class
An Adventure in Space and Time
Casualty
 (for S4C)
Upstairs Downstairs
Wizards vs Aliens
A Midsummer Night's Dream
 A 2014 adaption of Under Milk Wood starring Michael Sheen, Tom Jones, Matthew , Aimee- Edwards,  Jones, John -Davies, and many more famous predominantly Welsh faces.

Other productions produced by Roath Lock, but not necessarily filmed at the studios include: Merlin, Atlantis, Being Human, The Living and the Dead, Sherlock, War & Peace, The Game, The Passing Bells, The Green Hollow, A Poet in New York, and To Walk Invisible.

Doctor Who moved into the 170,000 sq ft (15,800 sq m) site in 2012. The Sarah Jane Adventures was also scheduled to move to the facility in 2012, but future production of the series was cancelled in April 2011 due to the death of lead actress Elisabeth Sladen. The village is part of the BBC's commitment to double television network production from Cardiff by 2016.

Surrounding development

Roath Basin is the largest single remaining undeveloped site in Cardiff Bay. It consists of approximately 27 acres and has an outline planning permission for 1,000 new homes and 100,000 sq m of commercial floor space. Igloo Regeneration, which is an investment fund managed by Aviva Investments, was selected by the Assembly Government as the Development Partner for the project.

Investment of £8.5 million is needed to provide a road connection through the site providing both private and public transport from Pierhead Street through to the Norwegian Church, where a new bridge will need to be constructed over the existing lock-entrance to the dock.

Transport links
The Roath Lock Drama Village was served by the Baycar (Cardiff Bus number 6) service operated by Cardiff Bus, that ran every 10 minutes to Cardiff Bay and the City Centre.

See also

New Broadcasting House, Cardiff
BBC Wales
Media in Cardiff

References

External links
 

BBC offices, studios and buildings
Television in Wales
British television studios
Buildings and structures in Cardiff
BBC Cymru Wales